James Ingram (1952–2019) was an American R&B singer.

James Ingram may also refer to:

James Ingram (academic) (1774–1850), English academic
James Ingram (diplomat) (born 1928), Australian company director, public servant and diplomat
James Ingram (minister) (1776–1879), Church of Scotland minister
Sir James Herbert Charles Ingram, 4th Baronet (born 1966) of the Ingram baronets
James M. Ingram (politician), of Texas Senate, District 2
James Ingram (composer), Sound Designer and Composer, engaged to actress Brittany Curran

See also
James Ingram Merrill (1926–1995), American poet